Hydrogen telluride is the inorganic compound with the formula H2Te. A hydrogen chalcogenide and the simplest hydride of tellurium, it is a colorless gas. Although unstable in ambient air, the gas can exist at very low concentrations long enough to be readily detected by the odour of rotting garlic at extremely low concentrations; or by the revolting odour of rotting leeks at somewhat higher concentrations. Most compounds with Te–H bonds (tellurols) are unstable with respect to loss of H2. H2Te is chemically and structurally similar to hydrogen selenide, both are acidic. The H–Te–H angle is about 90°. Volatile tellurium compounds often have unpleasant odours, reminiscent of decayed leeks or garlic.

Synthesis
Electrolytic methods have been developed.

H2Te can also be prepared by hydrolysis of the telluride derivatives of electropositive metals.  The typical hydrolysis is that of aluminium telluride:

Al2Te3  +  6 H2O  →    2 Al(OH)3  +  3 H2Te

Other salts of Te2− such as MgTe and sodium telluride can also be used. Na2Te can be made by the reaction of Na and Te in anhydrous ammonia. The intermediate in the hydrolysis, can be isolated as salts as well.

Hydrogen telluride cannot be efficiently prepared from its constituent elements, in contrast to H2Se.

Properties
 is an endothermic compound, degrading to the elements at room temperature:
   →  + Te
Light accelerates the decomposition. It is unstable in air, being oxidized to water and elemental tellurium:
2  +  → 2  + 2 Te

It is almost as acidic as phosphoric acid (Ka = 8.1×10−3), having a Ka value of about 2.3×10−3. It reacts with many metals to form tellurides.

See also
Dimethyl telluride

References

Hydrogen compounds
Triatomic molecules
Tellurides